FirstBank (stylized as 1 FirstBank), is a banking institution in Puerto Rico. The company is headquartered in San Juan, with branches there and in twenty-two other Puerto Rican cities. "1FirstBank Florida" includes branches in Miami, Boca Raton and Ft Lauderdale.

As of 2020, FirstBank had 8 branches in Florida.  Aurelio Alemán-Bermudez has served as president of 1 FirstBank since 2009.

In 2020, 1 FirstBank bought Banco Santander Puerto Rico to expand its operations in Puerto Rico.

In 2020, 1 FirstBank received an award from the USDA Rural Development program for being a top mortgage lender for people purchasing single family homes in Puerto Rico.

History
First Bank was known until the 1990s as First Federal.

References

External links

 FirstBank archived annual reports 
 FirstBank Florida site

Companies based in San Juan, Puerto Rico